Touchdown is the sixth album by Bob James, released in 1978 on his Tappan Zee label thru Columbia.

The album's title is a reference to this being James' sixth solo album (a touchdown being worth six points in American football), a pattern also followed by his previous album Heads (featuring a five cent coin on its cover) and next album Lucky Seven.

Taxi

Touchdown was a commercial breakout album for him due to its containing the song "Angela", the popular theme song to the 1970s television sitcom Taxi. The song was named after a guest character in the third episode of the first season ("Blind Date"), but after hearing the song, the producers made this the show's main theme, replacing their previous choice, which became this album's title track.

Track listing
All songs written by Bob James

"Angela (Theme from Taxi)" – 5:48
"Touchdown" – 5:44
"I Want to Thank You (Very Much)" – 7:07
"Sun Runner" – 6:17
"Caribbean Nights" – 8:46

Personnel 
 Bob James – acoustic piano, Yamaha electric grand piano, Fender Rhodes, Oberheim Polyphonic synthesizer, arrangements and conductor 
 Eric Gale – guitar solo (1), electric guitar (2, 5)
 Hiram Bullock – electric guitar (2-5), guitar solo (5), vocal solo (5)
 Earl Klugh – acoustic guitar (3, 4, 5)
 Richard Resnicoff – rhythm acoustic guitar (3)
 Gary King – electric bass (1, 2)
 Ron Carter – acoustic bass (3, 4, 5), piccolo bass solo (5)
 Idris Muhammad – drums (1)
 Steve Gadd – drums (2-5)
 Ralph MacDonald – percussion (1-4)
 Mongo Santamaria – percussion (5)

Brass and Woodwinds
 Phil Bodner – alto saxophone, flute, oboe
 Jerry Dodgion – alto saxophone, flute
 David Sanborn – alto saxophone solo (3)
 Howard Johnson – baritone saxophone, contrabass clarinet
 Harvey Estrin – tenor saxophone, clarinet, flute
 George Marge – tenor saxophone, English horn, flute, oboe, recorder
 Hubert Laws – flute solo (3, 4, 5)
 Wayne Andre – trombone
 Dave Bargeron – trombone
 Alan Raph – trombone
 Randy Brecker – trumpet
 Jon Faddis – trumpet
 Mike Lawrence – trumpet
 Ron Tooley – trumpet

Strings
 David Nadien – concertmaster 
 Jonathan Abramowitz, Seymour Barab, Richard Locker and Charles McCracken – cello
 Jean Dane, Theodore Israel, Sue Pray and Emanuel Vardi – viola
 Harry Cykman, Lewis Eley, Max Ellen, Louis Gabowitz, Diana Halprin, Harold Kohon, Harry Lookofsky, John Pintavalle, Matthew Raimondi, Herbert Sorkin and Richard Sortomme – violin

Production 
 Bob James – producer 
 Jay Chattaway – associate producer 
 Joe Jorgensen – associate producer, engineer
 Tim Bomba – assistant engineer
 Ted Bronson – assistant engineer
 Lou Jannone – assistant engineer
 Harold Tarowsky – assistant engineer
 Vlado Meller – mastering 
 Marion Orr – production coordinator 
 Paula Scher – art direction, design
  Buddy Endress – photography

Studios
 Recorded at CBS Studios, Sound Mixers and A&R Recording (New York, NY).
 Remixed at Sound Mixers 
 Mastered at Columbia Mastering (New York, NY).

Charts

References

External links 
 Bob James-Touchdown at Discogs

1978 albums
Bob James (musician) albums
Albums produced by Bob James (musician)